Anthony Clive "Tony" Barwick (10 July 1934 – 18 August 1993) was a British television scriptwriter who worked extensively on series created and produced by Gerry Anderson.

Career

Television
Barwick scripted episodes for Anderson's Supermarionation series Thunderbirds (two out of 32 episodes), Captain Scarlet and the Mysterons (21 out of 32 episodes), Joe 90 (16 out of 30 episodes) and The Secret Service (four out of 13 episodes), as well as his live-action series UFO (14 out of 26 episodes), The Protectors (ten out of 52 episodes) and Space: 1999 (two out of 48 episodes).

He also contributed scripts to Anderson and Christopher Burr's Supermacromation series Terrahawks, writing under various pseudonyms for all but one episode. All of these pseudonyms ended with the suffix "-stein" in imitation of the name of the leading character, Dr Tiger Ninestein. Barwick wrote 35 of the 39 episodes of Terrahawks; "The Midas Touch", which he co-wrote with Trevor Lansdowne, is the only episode for which he used his real name. With the completion of Terrahawks, Barwick went on to script the whole of Anderson's two-part stop-motion series Dick Spanner, P.I. (for which he was credited as "Harry Bolt").

In addition to his work as scriptwriter, Barwick also served as script editor for Captain Scarlet, Joe 90 and UFO. Other writing credits include The Persuaders!, The Pathfinders, The Professionals and Shadowchaser. His scriptwriting is known for its humour. He often set the events of a particular episode on the date of his birthday, 10 July.

Other work
Anderson and Barwick collaborated on other projects, one of which was a script treatment – ultimately rejected – for the James Bond film Moonraker. The similarities between this script and the 1979 film are limited to their shared title, with the plot of the completed film incorporating none of Barwick and Anderson's ideas.

Personal life
Barwick continued to work as a scriptwriter until his death of cancer in August 1993 at the age of 59. He was married to Velma Barwick with whom he had three children: Deborah, Craig and Kerry. Barwick was first married to Catherine Deirdre Power.

References

External links

1934 births
1993 deaths
British science fiction writers
British television writers
Deaths from cancer in England
20th-century British novelists
20th-century British screenwriters